Human Comedy (in Persian: کمدی انسانی; transliterated: Comedi Ensani) is a 2017 Iranian drama film directed, written and produced by Mohammad Hadi Karimi and about A comedy of the life of someone who must live like the people around him despite his own preference.

Plot 
Some decades ago, a boy was punished in school because he was a left-hander! As he grew up he was in the minority in other situations, and he was punished for it. At last, He decides to raise his inner capacity while being a minority and this is the beginning of his salvation...

Awards
NTFF - Norway Tamil Film Festival (2018) - Best Actor  (Arman Darvish)
NTFF - Norway Tamil Film Festival (2018) - Best Film (Mohammad Hadi Karimi)

References

Iranian Cinema Shines in Norway Tamil Film Festival
SalamCinama-comedi ensani

External links
Human Comedy in Internet Movie Database

2017 films
2017 drama films
Iranian drama films
2010s Persian-language films